Ampyrone is a metabolite of aminopyrine with analgesic, anti-inflammatory, and antipyretic properties. Its use as a drug is discouraged due to the risk of agranulocytosis. It is used as a reagent for biochemical reactions producing peroxides or phenols. Ampyrone stimulates liver microsomes and is also used to measure extracellular water.

References

Pyrazolones
Analgesics
Antipyretics
Nonsteroidal anti-inflammatory drugs
Human drug metabolites